Carlos Robles Piquer (13 October 1925 – 8 February 2018) was a Spanish diplomat and politician.

Political career
His political career started in 1962, when he was named director general of information. Robles was then appointed director general of the popular culture and entertainment. He served as minister of education between 1975 and 1976, before assuming the office of Secretary of State for Foreign Affairs. After a stint as Director General of RTVE, Robles was elected to the Congress of Deputies from Madrid. He left the national legislature in 1987, and became a member of the European Parliament for Spain until 1999.

Robles' marriage to Elisa Fraga Iribarne, the sister of Manuel Fraga Iribarne, produced a son, José María Robles Fraga, who is also a politician.

References

1925 births
2018 deaths
Spanish diplomats
Education ministers of Spain
People's Alliance (Spain) politicians
MEPs for Spain 1986–1987
MEPs for Spain 1987–1989
MEPs for Spain 1989–1994
MEPs for Spain 1994–1999
Politicians from Madrid
Members of the Senate of Spain
Members of the 1st Assembly of Madrid
Members of the AP–PDP–UL Parliamentary Group (Assembly of Madrid)
Secretaries of State for Foreign Affairs (Spain)